Hydronium perchlorate is the chemical compound with the formula . It is an unusual salt due to it being a solid and stable hydronium salt.

Production
Hydronium perchlorate is produced by the reaction of anhydrous perchloric acid and water in a 1:1 molar ratio:

This method was found to produce some byproducts and is not a reliable method. A more reliable method was reported by the cyclocondensation of sodium 2,6-diformyl-4-methylphenolate(produced by the reaction of 2,6-diformyl-4-methylphenol and sodium hydroxide in ethanol) and p-phenylenediamine via the sodium template method. It resulted in a yellow solid which was transmetallated with copper(II) perchlorate then refluxed in nitrogen for 1 hour. The resulting solution was filtered and cooled to form the colorless crystals of hydronium perchlorate.

It can also be produced by the reaction of anhydrous nitric acid and perchloric acid.

References

Oxonium compounds
Perchlorates